Wangerin may refer to:

Friedrich Heinrich Albert Wangerin (1844-1933), German mathematician
Walther Wangerin (1884–1938), German botanist
Walter Wangerin, Jr. (1944-2021), American author
Wangerin Organ Company, American pipe organ company
The German name of Węgorzyno, Poland